Jimtown is the name of several communities in the United States, including:
Jimtown, Delaware
Jimtown, Indiana
Jimtown, Missouri
Jimtown, Ohio
Jimtown, Oregon
Jimtown, West Virginia (disambiguation), multiple locations
Jimtown, Wisconsin